is a railway station in the city of Kamo, Niigata, Japan, operated by East Japan Railway Company (JR East).

Lines
Kamo Station is served by the Shin'etsu Main Line and is 103.8 kilometers from the terminus of the line at Naoetsu Station.

Station layout

The station consists of two ground-level opposed side platforms connected by an underground passageway, serving two tracks. The station has a Midori no Madoguchi staffed ticket office.

Platforms

History
Kamo Station opened on 20 November 1897. The privately owned Kanbara Railway Company operated a line from Kamo to Gosen from 1930–1988. With the privatization of Japanese National Railways (JNR) on 1 April 1987, the station came under the control of JR East.

Passenger statistics
In fiscal 2017, the station was used by an average of 2837 passengers daily (boarding passengers only).

Surrounding area

Kamo City Hall
Kamo Post Office

See also
 List of railway stations in Japan

References

External links

 JR East station information 

Railway stations in Niigata Prefecture
Railway stations in Japan opened in 1897
Shin'etsu Main Line
Stations of East Japan Railway Company
Kamo, Niigata